Kachavani Singaram is a village in Ranga Reddy district in Telangana, India. It falls under Ghatkesar mandal and is located on the banks of the Musi River.

References

Villages in Ranga Reddy district